Hussam Abdulmohsen Alangari (Arabic  حسام بن عبدالمحسن العنقري , born November 12, 1966) is the President of the General Court of Audit (GCA) in the Kingdom of Saudi Arabia since May 7, 2016. He was appointed by a royal Decree and was renewed by another one, No. (A) 535, dated Rajab 28, 1441 AH (March 23, 2020 AD).

Dr. Al-Anqari supervises the organization of the General Court of Audit and manages all its work related to the subsequent control of all state revenues and expenditures, as well as monitoring all movable and immovable state funds.

Early life and Education
Hussam Abdulmohsen Alangari was born in Riyadh in 1966. He attended the Al-Thager School in Jeddah and then graduated from the Accounting Department of the Faculty of Economics and Administration at King Abdulaziz University, where he joined to work as a lecturer in 1991.

Career
In 2000, he was appointed as an associate professor at the same department after getting his Ph.D. in accounting and financial management from the University of Essex in England. He was promoted to the position of associate professor in 2004, and then to full professor in 2008.

To his credit, he has over fifty research papers, articles, and monographs, both in English and Arabic. He also has three editions of his textbook, Auditing in the Kingdom of Saudi Arabia, and one edition of Who Takes Account of the Certified Public Accountant.

Between 2005 and 2009, he was appointed an Associate Dean for Postgraduate Studies and Academic Research at the Faculty of Economics and Administration at King Abdulaziz University. In 2009, he was appointed Dean of the Faculty of Economics and Administration for two years, before his term was extended for another two years in 2011. He was the Acting Dean of the Faculty of Law during the same period. On January 11, 2013, he was appointed by Royal Decree No. A/45 [EAD1] as a member of the Ash-Shura Council for four years, during which he was elected vice chair of the Financial Committee for the first two years, then chair of the same committee for the third and fourth years.

He currently holds the positions of Second-Vice Chair of the Governing Board of the International Organization of Supreme Audit Institutions (INTOSAI), Chairman of Policy, Finance, and Administration (PFAC), and Co-Chair of the INTOSAI-Donor Steering Committee (IDSC). and member of the INTOSAI Development Initiative (IDI) Board of Directors for a three-year term starting in January 2023. Since 2022, Dr. Alangari has also been chairing the Arab Organization of Supreme Audit Institutions (ARABOSAI) for three years. In November 2020, another decree appointed Alangari chair of the board of directors of the Saudi Institute of Internal Auditors. He also chairs the Arab Confederation for Institutes of Internal Auditors (ARABCIIA) since January 2023 and was appointed as a member of the Global Board of Directors of the Institute of Internal Auditors (IIA) for a two-year term starting in July 2022.

References 

1966 births
Living people
People from Riyadh